I'll Never Get Out of This World Alive is the 14th studio album by American singer-songwriter Steve Earle, released in 2011, produced by T-Bone Burnett. All of the songs are written by Earle, with the exception of the title track, which is included as a download-only bonus track.

Four of the songs were originally written for other projects.  "This City", was originally written for the David Simon show Treme and appears on its soundtrack. It was nominated for a Grammy in 2011 for "Best Song Written For Motion Picture, Television Or Other Visual Media".  "Lonely are the Free" was written and recorded for the 2010 Tim Blake Nelson film Leaves of Grass, in which Earle had a small part.  This earlier version was played over the closing credits and appeared on the film soundtrack.  Earle originally wrote the tracks "God Is God" and "I am a Wanderer" for Joan Baez's Day After Tomorrow album.

Earle has said that the title for the album was inspired by the Hank Williams song of the same name which is available as a bonus track from iTunes. Earle also wrote a novel with the same title.

Track listing

iTunes exclusive

Chart performance

Personnel
 Steve Earle - vocals, acoustic guitar, banjo, bouzouki, mandolin, harmonica
 Sara Watkins - vocals, fiddle
 T Bone Burnett - vocals, electric guitar
 Jay Bellerose - drums
 Dennis Crouch - bass
 A. Michael Brown - euphonium
 Roland Guerin - acoustic bass
 Keefus Ciancia - Mellotron
 Jackson Smith - electric guitar
 Sammie Williams - trombone
 Tim Robbins
 Jonathan Gross - tuba
 Tracey Griffin - flugelhorn
 Allison Moorer - backing vocals

References

2011 albums
Steve Earle albums
Albums produced by T Bone Burnett
New West Records albums